Ryan Bolton (born March 26, 1973 in Rapid City, South Dakota) is an American athlete who competed in triathlon at the 2000 Summer Olympics.

Bolton competed in cross country, swimming and track for Campbell County High School in Gillette, Wyoming. He ran cross country and track for the University of Wyoming.

Bolton competed in the first Olympic triathlon, at the 2000 Summer Olympics.  He finished in 25th place with a total time of 1:50:52.95.  Bolton won the 2002 Ironman Triathlon at Lake Placid, New York.  Bolton was coached by Joe Friel. , Bolton was still competing in triathlon.

Bolton now coaches a group of elite runners in Santa Fe, New Mexico, with the Harambee Track Club.

References

External links 
Ryan Bolton at ITU's Triathlon.org

1973 births
Living people
Triathletes at the 2000 Summer Olympics
Olympic triathletes of the United States
Sportspeople from Rapid City, South Dakota
American male triathletes
University of Wyoming alumni